The River Cain (Afon Cain in Welsh) is a river in north Powys which flows into the River Vyrnwy.

Cain's source is just west of Llanfyllin, at the confluence of the Nant Alan and Nant Fyllon.

After flowing east through Llanfyllin, where it is joined by the small River Abel, it continues eastwards alongside the A490 highway. It then turns north-east to pass through Llanfechain and is joined by the Nant Llys before finally flowing east again. It is fed by the Brogan, before joining the Vyrnwy near Llansantffraid-ym-Mechain.

The Cain is 16 km long.

References

Cain
1Cain